Judy Baauw (born 12 February 1994) is a Dutch BMX rider. Her best achievement to date was a bronze medal at the 2018 UCI BMX World Championships.

Baauw achieved her first podium place in the World Cup circuit in Papendal in April 2017. A year later in 2018 she had her most successful season to date. She was third in the World Cup final standings and third in the World Championship, behind the Dutch sisters Laura Smulders and Merel Smulders. On 11 May 2019, Baauw recorded her first World Cup victory during the tournament at Papendal.

References

External links
 
 
 
 

1994 births
Living people
BMX riders
Dutch female cyclists
Olympic cyclists of the Netherlands
Cyclists at the 2020 Summer Olympics
Cyclists from Gelderland
21st-century Dutch women